The Helsinki Central Library Oodi, commonly referred to as Oodi, is a public library in Helsinki, Finland. The library is situated in the Kluuvi district, close to Helsinki Central Station and next to Helsinki Music Centre and Kiasma Museum of Contemporary Art. Despite its name, the library is not the main library in the Helsinki City Library system, which is located in Pasila instead.

History 
A design competition in 2012 to build the library was won by the Finnish architectural firm ALA Architects and structural design by Ramboll Finland. ALA Architects won the commission over 543 other competitors. The library was planned to be a three-story building and to include a sauna (which hasn't materialised ) and a ground-floor movie theatre. In January 2015, the Helsinki City Council voted 75–8 to launch the building project. The City of Helsinki budgeted  for the building.

The name was selected from a pool of some 1,600 names proposed by the public. According to Helsinki Deputy City Director Ritva Viljanen, "Oodi" was chosen because it's easy to remember, easy to say, and easy to translate. The selection jury also did not want to name the new library after a person.

The library was built in the Töölönlahti district next to Helsinki Music Centre and Kiasma Museum of Contemporary Art and inaugurated on 5 December 2018 on the eve of the Finnish Independence Day.

Awards 
In 2019, the International Federation of Library Associations (IFLA) named Oodi as the best Public Library of the Year.

Services 
Specially designed robots transport books to the third floor that has an  area designated for books. The rest of the space is designed for meetings and events.

The National Audiovisual Institute (KAVI) organizes regular archival film screenings at the Kino Regina cinema, located since 2019 in the Helsinki Central Library Oodi.

Gallery

See also
 Helsinki Metropolitan Area Libraries
 Helsinki University Library
 National Library of Finland
 Tampere Central Library Metso
 Turku Main Library
 Seinäjoki Library

References

External links

Concept designs and images of the upcoming Helsinki Central Library
Helsinki Central Library project description

Buildings and structures in Helsinki
Libraries in Finland
Wooden architecture
Wooden buildings and structures in Finland
2018 establishments in Finland
Libraries established in 2018